Tyranny and Mutation (stylized on the cover as THE BLVE ÖYSTER CVLT: TYRANNY AND MVTATION) is the second studio album by American hard rock band Blue Öyster Cult, released on February 11, 1973 by Columbia Records. It was produced by Murray Krugman and Sandy Pearlman. On May 12, 1973, the album peaked at No. 122 on the Billboard 200 chart.

The only single released from the album, "Hot Rails to Hell," did not chart.

Composition and songs
The album was recorded in late 1972 at Columbia Studios in New York City.

"Baby Ice Dog" features lyrics by singer/poet Patti Smith, who would make several more lyrical contributions to the band's repertoire over its career.

The song "The Red and the Black," with lyrics referencing the Royal Canadian Mounted Police, is a re-titled, re-recorded version of "I'm on the Lamb But I Ain't No Sheep" from the band's eponymous debut album. The song was later covered by the Minutemen and Band of Susans. AllMusic critic Hal Horowitz called it "one of the best and most propulsive rockers in the BÖC catalog."

Critical reception

Tyranny and Mutation received mixed reviews from contemporary critics. Gordon Fletcher of Rolling Stone wrote a raving review for the album and called Blue Öyster Cult "one of the best bands America's got." Robert Christgau, writing for The Village Voice, praised the band's disregard for "the entire heavy ethos", but wondered if the "parody-surreal refraction of the abysmal 'poetry' of heavy" in the lyrics could be a start for a return to conformism. The Rolling Stone Album Guide described the album as "one molten hook after another" and praised the four-song "opening suite" comprising the first side of the album.
On the contrary, Mike Saunders of Phonograph Records judged Tyranny and Mutation "a real disappointment", definitely inferior to their debut album and lacking "the sort of brashness that almost defines hard rock or metal music." Ian MacDonald of the British New Musical Express was very critical of the Pearlman/Meltzer "crass Satan-speed-and-sad-ism" lyrics and of the band's music which "tend to leave the listener aurally shaken, but emotionally unstirred."

Modern reviews are generally positive. Thom Jurek of AllMusic noted how BÖC "brightened their sound and deepened their mystique" on this album and described the music as "screaming, methamphetamine-fueled rock & roll that was all about attitude, mystery, and a sense of nihilistic humor that was deep in the cuff", judging Tyranny and Mutation a "classic album" as much as its follow-up Secret Treaties. Martin Popoff in his Collector's Guide to Heavy Metal acknowledged the progress shown in production values from their debut, but found the sound "still mired in an oddly appealing maze of cobwebs", despite Blue Öyster Cult parading a slew of classic songs and "quickly becoming something very imposing".

Release history
In addition the conventional 2 channel stereo version the album was also released in a 4 channel quadraphonic version on LP record and 8-track tape in 1974. The quad LP release was encoded in the SQ matrix system.

Track listing

Personnel
Band members
 Eric Bloom – rhythm guitar, synthesizers, vocals
 Donald "Buck Dharma" Roeser – lead guitar, vocals
 Allen Lanier – keyboards, rhythm guitar
 Joe Bouchard – bass guitar, keyboards, vocals
 Albert Bouchard – drums, vocals

Production
Murray Krugman, Sandy Pearlman – producers
Tim Geelan, Lou Schlossberg, Phil Giambalvo – engineers
Jack Ashkinazy – mastering
Bruce Dickinson – reissue producer
Vic Anesini – re-mastering

Charts

References

Blue Öyster Cult albums
1973 albums
Albums produced by Murray Krugman
Albums produced by Sandy Pearlman
Columbia Records albums